The Episcopal Diocese of Hawai'i is the ecclesiastical territory or diocese of the Episcopal Church of the Anglican Communion in the United States encompassing the state of Hawaii.  It is led by the Episcopal Bishop of Hawaii pastoring the Hawaiian Islands from the Cathedral Church of Saint Andrew in Honolulu.

The territorial jurisdiction which the Episcopal Diocese of Honolulu holds today was given up to American Episcopalians after the 1893 overthrow of Queen Liliuokalani, head of the Church of Hawaii.  The Church of Hawaii, also called the Hawaii Reformed Catholic Church, was established by King Kamehameha IV and his consort Queen Emma in 1862.  The king and queen, friends of Queen Victoria of the United Kingdom, were devout members of the Church of England.  Episcopalians continue the Anglican Church of Hawaii tradition of celebrating the Feast of the Holy Sovereigns each November 28, in honor of Kamhehameha IV and Queen Emma.

Bishops
Thomas Nettleship Staley (1862–1870) [British]
Alfred Willis (1870–1902) [British]; married Emma Mary Simeon, daughter of Charles Simeon

Missionary

 
 Henry Bond Restarick (1902–1920; first American bishop)
 John Dominique LaMothe (1921–1928)
 Samuel Harrington Littell (1930–1943)
 Harry S. Kennedy (1944–1966)
 Charles P. Gilson, Suffragan Bishop of Honolulu (resident-bishop for Taiwan, 1961–1964)

Diocesan

 Edwin Lani Hanchett (1969–1975)
 Edmond L. Browning (1976–1985)
 Donald Purple Hart (1986–1994)
 Richard Sui On Chang (1997–2006)
 Robert Fitzpatrick (2007–)

Churches

 Hawaii
 Church of the Holy Apostles, Hilo, Vicar, The Reverend Katlin McCallister
 Christ Church, Kona, Kealakekua, Vicar, The Reverend Dwight Brown
 St. Augustine's Church, Kapa'au, Vicar, The Reverend Diana Akiyama
 St. Columba Church, Pa'ahau, Priest with oversight, The Reverend David Stout
 St. James Church, Waimea, Rector, The Reverend David Stout
 St. Jude's Church, Oceanview, (no current vicar)

 Kauai
 All Saints', Kapaʻa (first Episcopal Church built in 1925), Priest-in-Charge, the Rev. David Jackson
 Christ Memorial, Kilauea
 St. John's, ʻEleʻele
 St. Paul's, Kekaha
 St. Michael and All Angels and All Angels, Lihue (dedicated in 1991), Rector, The Reverend Andrew McMullen

 Maui
 Good Shepherd Episcopal Church, Wailuku
 Holy Innocents, Lahaina
 St. John's Episcopal Church, Kula, Rector, The Reverend Kerith Harding  
 Trinity-by-the-Sea

 Molokai
 Grace Church, Hoolehua, Father John Lunn

 Oahu
 Cathedral of Saint Andrew, Honolulu, The Reverend Canon Heather Patton-Graham, Provost and Canon Residentiary; The Reverend Dr. Ha'aheo Guanson, Assisting Priest for Pastoral Care; The Reverend Andrew J. Arakawa, Assisting Priest 
 Calvary Mission, Kaneohe, (no current vicar)
 Emmanuel Church, Kailua, Vicar, vacant
 Epiphany Church, Honolulu, Rector, vacant
 Good Samaritan Church, Honolulu, Vicar, vacant
 Holy Cross Church, Kahuku, (no current rector)
 Holy Nativity Church, Honolulu, Interim Rector, The Rev. Cn. Kate Cullinane; Curate, The Rev. Christopher Bridges; Deacon, The Rev. Dcn. Robert Steele
 St. Christopher's, Kailua, Rector, The Reverend Giovan King
 St. Clement's, Makiki, Interim Rector, The Reverend Canon Catherine Cullaine
 St. Elizabeth's, Kalihi, Rector, The Reverend David Gierlach
 St. George's Church and School, Pearl Harbor, Closed.
 St. John's By-The-Sea, Kaneohe, Vicar, The Reverend Paul Nahoa Lucas
 St. John's The Baptist, Waianae, Acting Vicar, The Reverend Kaleo Patterson
 St. Luke's, Vicar, The Reverend Raymond Woo
 St. Mark's, Honolulu, Rector, The Reverend Paul Lillie
 St. Matthew's, Waimanalo, Vicar, The Reverend Mahi Bemis
 St. Mary's, Mo`ili`ili, Rector, vacant
 St. Nicholas', Kapolei, Vicar, The Reverend Ernesto Pasalo, Jr.
 St. Paul's, Honolulu, Vicar, The Reverend Randolph Albano (jointly administered by the Episcopal Church and the Philippine Independent Church)
 St. Peter's, Honolulu, Rector, The Reverend  Diane Martinson
 St. Stephen's, Wahiawa, Acting Vicar, The Reverend Kaleo Patterson
 St. Timothy's, Aiea, Priest-in-Charge, The Rev. Daniel Leatherman

Schools 
 St. Andrew's Schools, Honolulu, Chaplain, The Reverend Heather Graham
 Iolani School, Honolulu, Chaplains, The Reverend Tim Moorehouse, The Reverend Andrew J. Arakawa
 Seabury Hall

References

External links
Diocese of Hawai'i website 
Journal of the Annual Convocation of the Missionary District of Honolulu

Hawaii
Diocese of Hawaii
Religious organizations established in 1893
Anglican dioceses established in the 19th century
1893 establishments in Hawaii
Province 8 of the Episcopal Church (United States)